

Fritz Pliska (20 December 1915 – 28 August 1995) was a German footballer and coach in the German Bundesliga and in the Dutch Eredivisie. During World War II, he served as an army soldier in the Wehrmacht and was a recipient of the Knight's Cross of the Iron Cross.

Awards
 German Cross in Gold on 22 February 1942 as Oberfeldwebel in the 3./Panzer-Pionier-Bataillon
 Knight's Cross of the Iron Cross on 26 March 1944 as Oberfeldwebel and Zugführer (platoon leader) in the 3./Panzer-Pionier-Bataillon 19

References

Citations

Bibliography

External links
 
 
 

1915 births
1995 deaths
Sportspeople from Gelsenkirchen
Recipients of the Gold German Cross
Recipients of the Knight's Cross of the Iron Cross
People from the Province of Westphalia
German footballers
FC Schalke 04 players
German football managers
Borussia Mönchengladbach managers
SV Waldhof Mannheim managers
Fortuna Düsseldorf managers
Bayer 04 Leverkusen managers
Roda JC Kerkrade managers
Association football defenders
Footballers from North Rhine-Westphalia
German Army officers of World War II
Military personnel from Gelsenkirchen
Borussia Mönchengladbach players
West German footballers
West German expatriate football managers
West German expatriate sportspeople in the Netherlands
Expatriate football managers in the Netherlands